Tiger Park is a softball stadium located on the campus of Louisiana State University in Baton Rouge, Louisiana.  It serves as the home field of the LSU Lady Tigers softball team and is located on Skip Bertman Drive across from the LSU School of Veterinary Medicine.  The official capacity of the stadium is 2,671 people. Tiger Parks record attendance of 3,242 came on March 25, 2016, in a game versus the University of Florida.  The stadium also features an outfield berm, renamed the Tiger Park Terrace in 2016, that can accommodate in excess of 1,200 fans. The stadium opened prior to the 2009 college softball season.

In 2010, Tiger Park was rated the fifth-best architecture building by the LSU Faculty Senate Monthly Newsletter.

"Best seen at night, when its gables and overhang seem to brighten into a shimmering white sails winging through cool ebony skies, the softball stadium shows that LSU can come up with a building that plays to something other than the local taste for plantation imagery and Greco-Roman bric-a-brac. Welling out of a hillock in a way that suggests strong shoulders on the brink of swinging a home run, the softball stadium evidences a modest freshness that brings a smile and popcorn and hot dogs."

In 2013, Tiger Park was honored with the prestigious Field of the Year award by the Sports Turf Managers Association (STMA) for the college and university softball division. Tiger Park hosted the 2015 SEC softball tournament and 2015 NCAA Division I Regional.

Program Records at Tiger Park

Old Tiger Park (1992-2008), New Tiger Park (2009-Present)

Year-by-Year Attendance in the New Tiger Park

Gallery

See also
Tiger Park (1997)
LSU Tigers softball
LSU Tigers and Lady Tigers

References

External links
Tiger Park at LSUSports.net

College softball venues in the United States
LSU Tigers softball venues
Softball venues in Louisiana
Sports venues in Louisiana
Sports venues completed in 2009
2009 establishments in Louisiana